Raleigh Hall is a building in Windrush Square, Brixton. It is now home to the Black Cultural Archives, after being derelict for many years.

The building was originally two houses built in 1824, and is a Grade II listed building.

The hall had been used by the Cinema Museum in the mid 1980s. It had also been home to Klitsa Fashions, Omegas Fashion Dress Manufacturers, Arkwrights Ltd and the Raleigh Workshop.

It was placed on the English Heritage Register of Historic Buildings at Risk in 1992.

Gallery

External links 

landmark.lambeth.gov.uk
black-history-month.co.uk
Images of dereliction from the early 2000s

References

Grade II listed buildings in the London Borough of Lambeth
Brixton